Tällberg is a small village located in Leksand Municipality, Dalarna County in Sweden. It is situated on the shore of Lake Siljan, in the northern part of Leksand. A special character of the village is that all houses and buildings are made of wood, such as timber or log. The village itself has about 200 permanent residents and a further 400 people have holiday cottages. There are eight hotels in the village and it has developed from a farmer's village in the beginning of 1900 to one of the most known tourist and visitor resorts in Sweden.

Notable people

 Anita Björk, actress

References 

Populated places in Dalarna County
Populated places in Leksand Municipality